Songs of the Spanish Civil War were folk songs and anthems brought by fighters on both sides of the War. The songs were adapted into marching songs, or sung around campfires.

Traditional

Songs of the Republican side
¡Ay Carmela!, also known as El Paso del Ebro, - Republican song
Eusko Gudariak ("Basque Soldiers") - anthem of the Basque Autonomous Army
Los cuatro generales,  also known as El Puente de los Franceses, based on Los cuatro muleros by Federico García Lorca with lyrics by Ernst Busch
El Himno de Riego - anthem of the Spanish Republic
A Las Barricadas - Spanish anarchist anthem
Hijos del pueblo - Another anarchist anthem
Si me quieres escribir, also known as El Frente de Gandesa - Republican song
The Internationale - Socialist anthem
Jarama Valley - Republican song
Spaniens Himmel - "Spain's heaven spreads its brightest stars ..."
El quinto regimiento - Socialist anthem
Viva la FAI - Anarchist anthem
En la Plaza de mi Pueblo
Arroja la bomba - Anarchist song (there also exists a moderated version Luchemos Obreros and an Italian version Mano alla bomba)

Songs of the Nationalist side
 La Marcha Real - Anthem of Francoist Spain
 Cantos nacionales ("national songs") were accorded special honors.
Oriamendi - Carlist anthem
Cara al Sol - Falangist anthem
Cancion del Legionario - Song of the Spanish Legion
Camisa Azul - Falangist Song
Ya Hemos Pasao - Celia Gamez
Falangista Soy - Falangist Song
Cálzame las Alpargatas - Carlist Song
Arriba España - Italian Song.

Retrospective
"Juanita" - Björn Afzelius
 "1936, The Spanish Revolution" - The Ex
 "Viva la Quinta Brigada" (later retitled "Viva la Quince Brigada") - Christy Moore's tribute to the fallen Irish
"Spanish Bombs" - The Clash
"Life During Wartime" - The Talking Heads
"If You Tolerate This Your Children Will Be Next" - Manic Street Preachers
 Spain in My Heart: Songs of the Spanish Civil War (Various artists) (2007) —with contributions by Pete Seeger, Arlo Guthrie, Joel Rafael and Aoife (Finnes) Clancy (from Cherish the Ladies).
"On the Border" (Al Stewart) (1977) Year of the Cat album.
 "Always the Cause" (Al Stewart) (1995) Between the Wars
Flowers from Exile album by Rome

See also
 Canciones de la Guerra Civil Española album
 Pete Seeger (section 'Spanish Civil War songs')
 Ernst Busch (actor)
 Music of the American Civil War

References

External links
Songbook of the International Brigades'''
Songs of the Spanish Civil War
11 Songs of the Spanish Civil War
Spain's heavens or the Thaelmann Brigade